Magdalen of Sweden - Swedish: Magdalena and Madeleine - may refer to:

Magdalen of Sweden, Swedish princess 1448
Madeleine (legal spelling), Swedish princess 1982
Sophia Magdalen, Queen consort of Sweden 1771